Jordan Sekulow (born July 14, 1982) is an American lawyer, radio talk show host, former Washington Post blogger, political consultant, and author.
A veteran of three Presidential campaigns, Sekulow is the executive director at the American Center for Law & Justice, a conservative international public interest law firm and watchdog group founded by his father, Jay Sekulow.

Education
Sekulow graduated from George Washington University, receiving a bachelor's degree in political science. While there, he was founding a member of the Theta Zeta chapter of the Pi Kappa Phi fraternity. He graduated with a J.D. from Regent University in 2009. Sekulow also co-founded the Regent Journal of Law and Public Policy in 2008. Sekulow earned an LL.M in International Human Rights Law from the Georgetown University Law Center.

Career

Radio and television 

Sekulow was the host of The Jordan Sekulow Show, a daily talk show that has featured Mitt Romney, Newt Gingrich, Michele Bachmann and Herman Cain. 
Along with his father, Jay Sekulow, Jordan co-hosts Jay Sekulow Live!, a syndicated daily radio program that airs on nearly 1,000 AM and FM stations nationwide, as well as on XM and Sirius Satellite Radio networks. He is the co-host of ACLJ This Week, a weekly television news program broadcast on Trinity Broadcasting Network and Daystar.

Blogging 
On December 15, 2010, The Washington Post blog introduced Jordan Sekulow's featured blog, Religious Right Now, exploring "what social conservatives want."

Political consultancy 
Sekulow served as the National Youth Coalition Director for the George W. Bush 2004 presidential campaign. In the 2008 Republican Party presidential primaries, Sekulow worked for Mitt Romney, serving as a Vice Chair of his National Faith And Values Steering Committee. In 2015, Sekulow joined the Jeb Bush 2016 presidential campaign as a senior advisor.

Along with his father, Sekulow is a member of President Donald Trump's personal legal team.

Book Author 
Sekulow authored the book, The Next Red Wave: How Conservatives Can Beat Leftist Aggression, RINO Betrayal & Deep State Subversion in 2019.

Personal life

Jordan married Anna Jean Handzlik, now Anna Jean Sekulow on October 21, 2011. They currently live in Nashville, Tennessee with their daughter and son.

References

External links
 Jordan Sekulow
 American Center for Law and Justice

1982 births
21st-century American lawyers
American people of Ukrainian-Jewish descent
American talk radio hosts
Living people
Washington, D.C., Republicans
People from Atlanta
George Washington University alumni
Regent University School of Law alumni